Melissa Dell (born ) is the Andrew E. Furer Professor of Economics at Harvard University. Her research interests include development economics, political economy, and economic history.

In 2014, the International Monetary Fund named Dell among the 25 Brightest Young Economists. In 2018, she was awarded the Elaine Bennett Research Prize and the Calvó-Armengol International Prize; The Economist also named her one of "the decade’s eight best young economists."  She was awarded the John Bates Clark Medal in 2020.

Biography 
Dell grew up in Enid, Oklahoma, where she attended Oklahoma Bible Academy.  Despite difficulties completing races because of her poor eyesight, she was a champion long distance runner in high school, setting a state record in the 3000-meter distance.  As of 2010, she was an ultramarathon (100 km) runner. She was the first member of her family to go to college and the first student from her high school to attend Harvard University, and established an organization, "College Matters," and a book, "The College Matters Guide to Getting Into the Elite College of Your Dreams," to offer practical advice to ambitious students from similar backgrounds.

She graduated summa cum laude from Harvard in 2005 (B.A. economics) and attended the University of Oxford as a Rhodes Scholar receiving a M.Phil. in economics in 2007.  In 2012, she completed her Ph.D. in economics at the Massachusetts Institute of Technology.  She was a Junior Fellow of the Harvard Society of Fellows from 2012 to 2014, and joined the faculty at Harvard in 2014 as an Assistant Professor. She was promoted to Full Professor in 2018.

Research 

Dell's research interests include development economics, economic history and political economy. A major focus of her work has been explaining economic development through the persistence of historical institutions. For example, in her paper on the long-term effects of Peru's Mining Mita, she showed that current development outcomes were influenced by whether regions were included in forced labor policies that ended in the early 1800s. This paper was also methodologically important, as it was one of the first in economics to use a spatial regression discontinuity design. Dell has also investigated the effect of conflict on labor market and political outcomes and vice versa. Finally, she has influential work on the economic effects of climate, especially for developing economies. Much of her research has focused on Latin America and Southeast Asia.

Selected works 
 
 Dell, Melissa, Benjamin F. Jones, and Benjamin A. Olken. "Temperature shocks and economic growth: Evidence from the last half century." American Economic Journal: Macroeconomics 4, no. 3 (2012): 66–95.
 Dell, Melissa, Benjamin F. Jones, and Benjamin A. Olken. "What do we learn from the weather? The new climate-economy literature." Journal of Economic Literature 52, no. 3 (2014): 740–98.
 Dell, Melissa. "Trafficking networks and the Mexican drug war." American Economic Review 105, no. 6 (2015): 1738–79.
 Dell, Melissa, and Pablo Querubin. "Nation building through foreign intervention: Evidence from discontinuities in military strategies." The Quarterly Journal of Economics 133, no. 2 (2018): 701–764.

References 

American women economists
21st-century American economists
American development economists
Economic historians
Harvard University faculty
Living people
MIT School of Humanities, Arts, and Social Sciences alumni
Harvard College alumni
American Rhodes Scholars
Track and field athletes from Oklahoma
People from Enid, Oklahoma
Year of birth missing (living people)
1980s births
Economists from Oklahoma
21st-century American historians
American women historians
Historians from Oklahoma
Fellows of the Econometric Society
21st-century American women writers
Journal of Political Economy editors